Stokes House may refer to locations in the United States:

Arkansas 
Fremont Stokes House, Clarksville, Arkansas, listed on the NRHP in Johnson County, Arkansas
Stokes House (Evening Shade, Arkansas), listed on the NRHP in Sharp County, Arkansas
Taylor-Stokes House, Marcella, Arkansas, listed on the NRHP in Stone County, Arkansas

Iowa
Dr. Ella Stokes House, Oskaloosa, Iowa, listed on the NRHP in Iowa

Nevada
Stokes Castle, Austin, Nevada, listed on the NRHP in Nevada

New Jersey
Stokes-Lee House, Collingswood, New Jersey, listed on the NRHP in New Jersey
Stokes-Evans House, Marlton, New Jersey, listed on the NRHP in New Jersey
Charles Stokes House, Riverside, New Jersey, listed on the NRHP in Burlington County, New Jersey

Ohio
Benjamin A. Stokes House, Lebanon, Ohio, listed on the NRHP in Warren County, Ohio

Oregon
Francis Marion Stokes Fourplex, Portland, Oregon, listed on the NRHP in Oregon

South Carolina
Stokes-Mayfield House, Rock Hill, South Carolina, listed on the NRHP in South Carolina

South Dakota
Oliver O. Stokes House, Harding, South Dakota, listed on the NRHP in South Dakota

Architectural disambiguation pages